Rae Wilson Scarborough (July 23, 1917 – July 1, 1982) was a starting pitcher in Major League Baseball who played for the Washington Senators (1942–1943 and 1946–1950), Chicago White Sox (1950), Boston Red Sox (1951–52), New York Yankees (1952–53) and Detroit Tigers (1953). Scarborough batted and threw right-handed. He was born in Mount Gilead, North Carolina.

Playing career
In a ten-season career, Scarborough posted an 80–85 win–loss record in 318 games, 168 games started, 59 complete games, 9 shutouts, 75 games finished, 12 saves,  innings pitched, 1,487 hits allowed, 755 runs allowed, 656 earned runs allowed, 88 home runs allowed, 611 walks, 564 strikeouts, 44 hit batsmen, 30 wild pitches, 6,297 batters faced, 4 balks and a 4.13 ERA.

A Wake Forest graduate, Scarborough was used sparingly by the Washington Senators before World War II. After spending two years in the military service, he developed into a reliable starter. His most productive season came in 1948, when he had a 15–8 mark and recorded a 2.82 ERA, being only surpassed by Gene Bearden (2.43). In 1949 he won 13 games with the Senators, and again won 13 in 1950 for Washington (3) and the Chicago White Sox (10), a season in which he made his only All-Star appearance. On September 28, 1949, Scarborough ended Ted Williams' streak of most consecutive games reaching base safely at 84 games.

After winning 12 games for the Boston Red Sox in 1951, Scarborough was purchased by the New York Yankees in the 1952 midseason, as he went 5–1 during New York's successful pennant drive en route to the 1952 World Series. He played for the Yankees and Detroit Tigers in 1953, his last major league season.

Scarborough often received attention from the press in New York and Boston due to his off-season work as a pickle salesman for the Mt. Olive Pickle Company in Mount Olive, N.C. One newspaper called him the "Pickle Peddling Pitcher", and others ran cartoons showing him dunking opposing players in pickle barrels.

Retirement
Following his playing career, Scarborough moved to Mount Olive, North Carolina, where he opened an oil and supply company. Later he scouted for the Baltimore Orioles, California Angels and Milwaukee Brewers organizations, and also helped establish a baseball program at Mount Olive College. He spent the first part of the 1968 season on the Orioles' MLB coaching staff. Scarborough's grandson Garrett Blackwelder played basketball at East Carolina University from 1996 to 2000 and holds several shooting records.

Scarborough died at his home in Mount Olive, North Carolina, at the age of 64.

See also
 Chicago White Sox all-time roster

References

External links
Ray Scarborough - Baseballbiography.com

The Deadball Era

1917 births
1982 deaths
American League All-Stars
Baltimore Orioles coaches
Baltimore Orioles scouts
Baseball players from North Carolina
Boston Red Sox players
California Angels scouts
Chattanooga Lookouts players
Chicago White Sox players
Detroit Tigers players
Major League Baseball bench coaches
Major League Baseball pitchers
Major League Baseball scouts
Milwaukee Brewers scouts
New York Yankees players
People from Mount Gilead, North Carolina
People from Mount Olive, North Carolina
Selma Cloverleafs players
Washington Senators (1901–1960) players
Wake Forest University alumni
American military personnel of World War II